The 2018–19 international cricket season was from September 2018 to April 2019. 34 Test matches, 92 One Day Internationals (ODIs) and 74 Twenty20 International (T20Is), as well as 28 Women's One Day Internationals (WODIs) and 130 Women's Twenty20 Internationals (WT20Is), were played during this period. The season started with India leading the Test cricket rankings, England leading the ODI rankings and Pakistan leading the Twenty20 rankings. In October 2018, the International Cricket Council (ICC) introduced separate rankings for women's ODIs and T20Is for the first time, with Australia women leading both tables.

All men's Twenty20 matches played between member sides after 1 January 2019 were given full international status and classified as T20Is, as per a decision made by the ICC in April 2018 (the same had applied to women's Twenty20 matches since 1 July 2018). The first men's T20Is to be classified as such under these new rules took place at the 2019 ACC Western Region T20.

Men's international cricket started off with the 2018 Asia Cup Qualifier, which saw Hong Kong qualify for the 2018 Asia Cup. The Asia Cup started nine days later and was won by India, who beat Bangladesh in the final. Other highlights included New Zealand beating Pakistan in an away Test series for the first time in 49 years, India winning a Test series against Australia in Australia for the first time ever, and Sri Lanka becoming the first side from Asia to win a Test series against South Africa in South Africa. The last Test match of Bangladesh's tour of New Zealand was cancelled due to the Christchurch mosque shootings. In March 2019, Afghanistan won their first Test match, beating Ireland by seven wickets in their one-off Test in India.

On 20 October, the ICC announced a major revamp to the 2023 Cricket World Cup qualification process. Following the conclusion of the Division Three and Division Two tournaments, the World Cricket League (WCL) was scrapped and the new qualification pathway consisted of the following tournaments: CWC Super League (comprising the 12 Full Members and the Netherlands), CWC League 2 (comprising Scotland, Nepal, the United Arab Emirates, and the top four finishers the Division Two tournament), CWC Challenge League (the next best 12 nations based on final rankings in the WCL), CWC Play-Off, and the CWC Qualifier. The 2018 ICC World Cricket League Division Three tournament, which was held in Oman, saw Oman and the United States promoted to Division Two, while Singapore, Kenya, Denmark and Uganda were placed in the CWC Challenge League. The Division Two tournament, was held in Namibia in April. Oman, Namibia, the United States and Papua New Guinea all finished in the top four places, and gained ODI status in the process.

The qualification process for the 2020 ICC T20 World Cup started during the season. The East Asia-Pacific (EAP) Group B Subregional Qualifier, held in the Philippines, saw the Philippines qualify for the EAP Regional Qualifier. The Asia Eastern Sub Region Qualifier, held in Malaysia, saw Nepal, Singapore, and Malaysia qualify for the Asia Region Qualifier. The Africa Southern Sub Region Qualifier, held in Botswana, saw Botswana and Namibia qualify for the Africa Region Qualifier. The Americas Northern Sub Region Qualifier, held in the United States, saw Canada and the United States qualify for the America Region Qualifier. Papua New Guinea won the Regional Final of the EAP Qualifier to become the first team to qualify for the 2019 ICC T20 World Cup Qualifier tournament.

Women's international cricket started off with India's tour of Sri Lanka. The highlight of women's cricket for the 2018–19 season was the Women's World Twenty20, which was won by Australia. The 2019 ICC Women's Qualifier Asia saw Thailand qualify for both the 2019 ICC Women's World Twenty20 Qualifier and 2020 Women's Cricket World Cup Qualifier.

Season overview

Rankings

The following were the rankings at the beginning of the season.

September

2018 Asia Cup Qualifier

India women in Sri Lanka

2018 Asia Cup

Super Four

South Africa women in West Indies

New Zealand women in Australia

Zimbabwe in South Africa

October

Pakistan women in Bangladesh

West Indies in India

Australia in the United Arab Emirates

England in Sri Lanka

Australia women against Pakistan women in Malaysia

Zimbabwe in Bangladesh

Australia vs United Arab Emirates

New Zealand vs Pakistan in United Arab Emirates

November

South Africa in Australia

2018 ICC World Cricket League Division Three

2018 ICC Women's World Twenty20

India in Australia

West Indies in Bangladesh

December

Sri Lanka in New Zealand

Pakistan in South Africa

January

India in New Zealand

England in West Indies

India women in New Zealand

Sri Lanka in Australia

Nepal in United Arab Emirates

West Indies women in Pakistan and UAE

February

Sri Lanka women in South Africa

Bangladesh in New Zealand
The third and final Test match of the tour was cancelled due to the Christchurch mosque shootings.

2018–19 Oman Quadrangular Series

Sri Lanka in South Africa

2019 ICC Women's Qualifier Asia

Scotland in Oman

Ireland vs Afghanistan in India

England women in India

Australia in India

March

United States in United Arab Emirates

England women in Sri Lanka

2019 ICC T20 World Cup East Asia-Pacific Qualifier

Australia vs Pakistan in United Arab Emirates

Zimbabwe in India
Zimbabwe were scheduled to tour India to play one Test and three ODI matches. However, the dates clashed with the 2019 Indian Premier League, and the series was postponed.

April

United Arab Emirates in Zimbabwe

2019 ICC World Cricket League Division Two

Final standings

Notes

See also
 Associate international cricket in 2018–19

References

2018 in cricket
2019 in cricket
 
2018 sport-related lists